Never for Ever is the third studio album by English art rock singer Kate Bush, released on 7 September 1980 by EMI Records, it was Bush's first No. 1 album and was also the first album by a British female solo artist to top the UK Albums Chart, as well as being the first album by any female solo artist to enter the chart at No. 1. It has since been certified Gold by the BPI. It features the UK Top 20 singles "Breathing", "Army Dreamers" and "Babooshka", the latter being one of Bush's biggest hits. Bush co-produced the album with Jon Kelly.

Background
Beginning production after her 1979 tour, Never for Ever was Bush's second foray into production (her first was for the On Stage EP the previous year), aided by the engineer of Lionheart (1978), Jon Kelly. Bush was keen to start producing her work and felt that this was the first album she was happy with, since it was more personal.

The first two albums had resulted in a particular sound, which was evident in every track, with lush orchestral arrangements supporting the live band sound. The range of styles on Never for Ever is much more diverse, veering from the straightforward rocker "Violin" to the wistful waltz of hit single "Army Dreamers". Never for Ever was the first Kate Bush album to feature digital synthesizers and drum machines, in particular the Fairlight CMI, which was programmed by Richard James Burgess and John L. Walters of synth-pop band Landscape. Like her previous two albums, it was initially composed on piano.

Bush's literary and cinematic influences were again to the fore. "The Infant Kiss", the story of a governess who is frightened by the adult feelings she has for her young male charge (who is possessed by the spirit of a grown man), was inspired by the 1961 film The Innocents, which in turn had been inspired by The Turn of the Screw by Henry James. "The Wedding List" drew from François Truffaut's 1968 film The Bride Wore Black. "Delius (Song of Summer)" was inspired by the 1968 Ken Russell television film Song of Summer, which portrays the last six years of the life of English composer Frederick Delius, when Eric Fenby acted as his amanuensis. Fenby is mentioned in the lyrics ("in B, Fenby"). "Blow Away (for Bill)" commemorates her lighting director Bill Duffield, killed in an accident at Poole Arts Centre during her 1979 tour. The song links his name to those of several music stars who died in the previous decade—Minnie Riperton, Keith Moon, Sandy Denny, Sid Vicious, Marc Bolan—and one earlier icon, Buddy Holly.

Never for Ever is the only studio album by Bush up to Director's Cut (2011) not to have a title track. According to Bush, the title alluded to conflicting emotions, good and bad, which pass, as she stated: "we must tell our hearts that it is 'never for ever', and be happy that it's like that".

The album cover is an illustration (in pencil) by artist Nick Price, who had also designed the cover for the programme for her 1979 tour. Bush was pleased with the results (it depicts a multitude of animals and monsters emerging from under her skirt). Of the concept, Bush said that it reflects the title, depicting good and bad things that emerge from one's self. The album was released on compact disc in Japan in 1987 with the cover art modified. A section of the original cover art was enlarged, creating two different booklet covers: the outer one modified; and underneath the original. The album's cover was voted 'Greatest Album Cover of 1980' by Record Mirror.

Violin and Egypt were also performed live during The Tour of Life in April-May 1979. The Wedding List was also aired at BBC Christmas Special on December 28, 1979.

Release and critical reception

With work on the album completed in May, Never for Ever was released on 7 September 1980. Over the following week, Bush undertook a record signing tour of the UK including London, which resulted in lengthy queues down Oxford Street. During October she also undertook promotional appearances for the album throughout Europe, most prominently in Germany and France. In the US, the album was initially unreleased following the failure of her debut. As Bush gained a cult following over the coming years, however, Never for Ever was belatedly released in 1984 following the entry into the charts of her fourth album The Dreaming.

Never for Ever entered the UK Albums Chart on (week-ending) 20 September 1980 at No. 1. It remained there for one week, staying in the top 75 for a total of 23 weeks. The album became Bush's first record to reach the top position on the UK Albums Chart, also making her the first female British solo artist to achieve that status. Technically, Never for Ever is the first studio album (i.e. not a greatest hits compilation) by any solo female artist to reach number 1 in the UK as only Barbra Streisand and Connie Francis had achieved the feat prior to 1980 but with compilation albums (Diana Ross had also achieved three UK number 1 albums by then but these were also compilations and were credited to Diana Ross & The Supremes, and were therefore not solo albums).

Three singles were released from the album—all of which fared well in the charts. The first, "Breathing", reached No. 16 in the UK, as did the third, "Army Dreamers". The second single, "Babooshka", became one of Bush's biggest hits, peaking at No. 5 in the summer of 1980 in the UK and faring even better in Australia, where it reached No. 2 and was the 20th best-selling single of the year.

The album was favourably received by music critics at the time, save for a curiously critical review in Record Mirror, which appears to criticise the album (and Bush herself), while complimenting a number of tracks. Based largely on this album, Bush was voted "Best female artist of 1980" in polls taken in Melody Maker, Sounds, the Sunday Telegraph, and Capital Radio. Bush herself has said that it was her favourite album to date. More recently, AllMusic gave the album a favourable review, complimenting the three singles most highly but said that Bush would improve on the formula on later albums. In 2020, Rolling Stone included Never for Ever in their "80 Greatest albums of 1980" list, praising Bush for her songwriting and her imagination.

Track listing

Personnel
Credits are adapted from the Never for Ever liner notes.

 Kate Bush – vocals; piano; keyboards; harmony vocals; Fairlight CMI digital sampling synthesizer; Yamaha CS-80 polyphonic synthesizer (1, 4); arranger
 John L. Walters and Richard James Burgess – Fairlight CMI programming
 Max Middleton – Fender Rhodes piano (1, 3, 5, 6, 11); Minimoog (5); string arrangements (3, 6)
 Duncan Mackay – Fairlight CMI (4, 10)
 Michael Moran – Prophet-5 synthesizer (5)
 Larry Fast – Prophet synthesizer (11)
 Alan Murphy – electric guitar (1, 2, 6, 7, 8, 11); electric guitar solo (7); acoustic guitar (4, 10); bass (10)
 Brian Bath – electric guitar (1, 6, 7, 11); acoustic guitar (3, 4, 10); backing vocals (6, 10)
 Paddy Bush – backing vocals (1, 4, 5, 6, 10); balalaika (1); sitar; bass vocals and voice of "Delius" (2); koto (4); strumento de porco (psaltery) (5); harmonica and musical saw (6); banshee (7); mandolin (10)
 Kevin Burke – violin (7)
 Adam Skeaping – viola (8); string arrangements (8)
 Joseph Skeaping – lironi (8); string arrangements (8)
 John Giblin – bass (1); fretless bass (11)
 Del Palmer – fretless bass (3); bass guitar (5, 6, 7)
 Preston Heyman – drums (3, 5, 6, 7); percussion (2, 3, 5); backing vocals (4, 6)
 Stuart Elliott – drums (1, 11); bodhrán (10)
 Roland – percussion (2)
 Morris Pert – timpani (4); percussion (11) 
 Ian Bairnson – bass vocals (2)
 Gary Hurst – backing vocals (1, 4)
 Andrew Bryant – backing vocals (4)
 Roy Harper – backing vocals (11)
 The Martyn Ford Orchestra – strings (3, 6)

Production
 Kate Bush – producer
 Jon Kelly – co-producer; recording engineer
 Jon Jacobs – assistant engineer

Charts

Weekly charts

Year-end charts

Certifications and sales

See also 
 Kate Bush discography
 List of awards and nominations received by Kate Bush

References

External links
 

Kate Bush albums
1980 albums
Albums produced by Jon Kelly
EMI Records albums
EMI America Records albums
Harvest Records albums
Art rock albums by English artists
Art pop albums
Progressive rock albums by English artists
Albums recorded at AIR Studios